The supreme leader of Afghanistan, officially the supreme leader of the Islamic Emirate of Afghanistan and also styled by his religious title Amir al-Mu'minin, is the ruler, head of state, and highest religious authority of Afghanistan, as well as the leader of the Taliban. He has unlimited authority, though in practice he shares some power with the consultative Leadership Council, whose members he appoints. He also serves as the chairman of the Leadership Council and is the supreme commander of the Afghan Armed Forces.

The current supreme leader is Hibatullah Akhundzada, who assumed office in exile on 25 May 2016, upon being chosen by the Leadership Council, and came to power on 15 August 2021 with the Taliban's victory over Western-backed forces in the 2001–2021 war. Since coming to power, Akhundzada has issued numerous decrees that have profoundly reshaped government and daily life in Afghanistan by implementing his strict interpretation of the Hanafi school of Sharia law.

The supreme leader appoints and directs the prime minister and other members of the Cabinet, as well as judges and provincial and local leaders. He oversees their work together with the Leadership Council.

History 
The office was established by Mullah Mohammed Omar, who founded both the Taliban and the original Islamic Emirate of Afghanistan in the 1990s. On 4 April 1996, in Kandahar, followers of Omar bestowed upon him the title Amir al-Mu'minin (أمير المؤمنين), meaning "Commander of the Faithful", as Omar had donned a cloak taken from its shrine in the city, asserted to be that of the Islamic prophet Muhammad.

The Taliban views the Quran as its constitution. However, it approved a dastur, a document akin to a basic law, in 1998, which proclaimed Omar supreme leader but did not outline a succession process. In 1996 interview, Wakil Ahmed Muttawakil stated that the Amir al-Mu'minin is "only for Afghanistan", rather than a caliph claiming leadership of all Muslims worldwide.

Following the September 11 attacks and the United States invasion of Afghanistan in 2001, Omar was deposed and the office of the leader was replaced by a presidency. Nevertheless, all subsequent leaders of the Taliban have borne the title of Commander of the Faithful.

Following its offensive in 2021, the Taliban recaptured Kabul after the United States withdrew its forces on 15 August of that year and became Afghanistan's new de facto government again.

The supreme leader receives the highest government salary in the reinstated Islamic Emirate, at  monthly.

Selection 

The supreme leader is appointed by the Leadership Council.

Powers and duties 

Under Omar, the leader held absolute power, and the Taliban’s interpretation of Sharia was entirely his decision.

It is unclear what exactly the current role of the Emir is, but under the 1998 draft constitution of the first Islamic Emirate, the Leader of the Faithful would appoint justices of the Supreme Court.

Under the current government however, the Emir has final authority on political appointments, as well as political, religious, and military affairs. The Emir carries out much of his work through the Rabbari Shura, or the Leadership Council (which he chairs), based in Kandahar, which oversees the work of the Cabinet, and appointment of individuals to key posts within the cabinet.

However, in a report from Al Jazeera, the Cabinet has no authority, with all decisions being made confidentiality by Akhundzada and the Leadership Council.

List of supreme leaders 

Status

Timeline

Deputy Leader 

The deputy leader of Afghanistan, officially the deputy leader of the Islamic Emirate of Afghanistan, is the deputy emir of the Taliban, tasked with assisting the leader with his duties. All three leaders of the Taliban have had deputies, with the number of deputies fluctuating between one and three. Akhundzada has three deputies: Sirajuddin Haqqani, Mullah Yaqoob, and Abdul Ghani Baradar. Haqqani was first appointed as a deputy leader by Akhtar Mansour in 2015, and was retained by Akhundzada. Upon assuming office in 2016, Akhundzada appointed Yaqoob, a son of Mullah Omar, as a second deputy. Akhundzada appointed Baradar as a third deputy in 2019.

See also 
 Government of Afghanistan
 History of Afghanistan
 List of heads of state of Afghanistan
 List of Taliban insurgency leaders
 Politics of Afghanistan
 President of Afghanistan
 Supreme Leader of Iran
 Supreme Leader (North Korean title)

Notes

References 

Leader of the Islamic Emirate
Leader of the Islamic Emirate